The O le Ao o le Malo (Samoan for "Head of State") is the head of state of Samoa. The position is described in Part III of the 1960 Samoan constitution. At the time the constitution was adopted, it was anticipated that future heads of state would be chosen from among the four Tama a 'Aiga "matai" paramount chiefs in line with customary protocol. This is not a constitutional requirement, so Samoa can be considered a parliamentary republic rather than a constitutional monarchy. The government Press Secretariat describes Head of State as a "ceremonial president". The holder is given the formal style of Highness, as are the heads of the four paramount chiefly dynasties.

Members of the Council of Deputies act as deputy heads of state, standing in for the head of state when they are unable to fulfil their duties, such as when the Head of State is either absent or ill.

The current O le Ao o le Malo is Tuimalealiʻifano Vaʻaletoʻa Sualauvi II, who was elected to a five-year term which started on 21 July 2017. Tuimalealiʻifano was re-elected to a second five-year term on 24 August 2022, and renewed his oath of office on 19 October. His second term will end on 19 October 2027.

History of the office 

When Western Samoa became independent on 1 January 1962, the 1960 Constitution jointly named two of the four paramount chiefs (Tama a 'Aiga) to the office for life: Tanumafili II and Tupua Tamasese Meaʻole. They represented, respectively, the Malietoa and Tupua Tamasese, "two of the four main family lineages" of Samoa. They were jointly known as O Ao o le Malo and individually as O le Ao o le Malo. Mea'ole died a year later in 1963, leaving Malietoa Tanumafili II as the sole holder of the office until his death in 2007, aged 94. His replacement, Tui Ātua Tupua Tamasese Efi, had served two prior terms as Prime Minister and is the elder son of Tupua Tamasese Meaʻole. He was elected by the Samoan Legislative Assembly for a five-year term beginning on 20 June 2007 and again in July 2012 for a further five-year term. The 4th and current Head of State, Tuimalealiʻifano Vaʻaletoʻa Sualauvi II, the great grandson of Mau movement leader Tuimaleali'ifano Fa'aoloi'i and nephew of the original member of the Council of Deputies Tuimaleali'ifano Suatipatipa II, succeeded Tui Ātua Tupua Tamasese Efi after election by the Legislative Assembly for a five-year term on 30 June 2017 when Tui Ātua Tupua Tamasese Efi's term was nearing its end.

In 2019, the Samoan government amended the constitution, introducing term limits for the head of state. Once a head of state has completed their first five-year term, they are only eligible for reappointment once. Thus each head of state is permitted to serve for a maximum of ten years.

The official residence of the head of state was the former home of writer Robert Louis Stevenson, until it was damaged in cyclones in the 1990s; the building subsequently became the Robert Louis Stevenson Museum.

In November 2021, the Samoan government announced that it was considering an amendment to make the office of the O le Ao o le Malo a lifetime appointment. This suggestion was part of a review of the constitution.

Qualifications 

Article 18 of the Samoan constitution sets the qualifications for the position of Head of State. He must:
 be qualified for election as a member of parliament;
 possess such qualifications as the Fono may determine by resolution;
 not have previously been removed from the office on the grounds of misbehavior or infirmity.

Term of office 

The Head of State  is elected by the Fono for five years and can be re-elected once. The exceptions to this were Tanumafili and Meaʻole, who were exempted from the five-year term laid down by Article 19. A 2019 amendment to the constitution states that the Head of State can serve no more than two terms. There was an understanding that the office is to rotate among the four tama aiga families, of which the most recently elected Head of State belongs to the Tuimaleali'ifano clan, one of the four paramount chiefs alongside the Mataʻafa (a vacant chieftaincy since 2014).

Removal from office can occur in four ways:
 resignation;
 removal by the Fono on the grounds of misbehavior or mental or physical infirmity;
 approval by two-thirds of the Fono of a resolution for removal that is proposed and supported by at least a fourth of its members following at least fourteen days between the notice of motion and debate on the motion;
 death.

Duties and powers 

The position is that of a ceremonial Head of State, while actual power is held by the Prime Minister, whom the Head of State appoints on the recommendation of the Fono. While the Head of State "does not play an active role in government", they can dissolve the Fono and no act of parliament will become law without their approval - akin to royal assent in monarchies. The Head of State may also grant pardons.

Elections 

To date, there have been four elections for the office of Head of State. The first was held on 16 June 2007, in which Tui Ātua Tupua Tamasese Efi was elected unopposed by the 49-member strong parliament. The second was held on 19 July 2012, in which Efi was nominated by Prime Minister Tuila'epa Sa'ilele Malielegaoi and seconded by Palusalue Faʻapo II, the leader of the opposition. The third was held on 30 June 2017, in which Tuimalealiʻifano Vaʻaletoʻa Sualauvi II was elected unopposed. The fourth was held on 23 August 2022, in which Sualauvi II was reelected unopposed.

List of officeholders 

Symbols

† Died in office

Timeline

See also 

 Samoa
 Politics of Samoa
 List of colonial governors of Samoa
 Prime Minister of Samoa
 Lists of office-holders

Notes

References

External links 

 Website of the Head of State of the Independent State of Samoa
 Former website of the Head of State

1962 establishments in Western Samoa
 
Government of Samoa
Samoan chiefs
Samoan words and phrases
Polynesian titles
1962 establishments in Oceania